The Archdeacon of Lindisfarne is a senior ecclesiastical officer in the diocese of Newcastle of the Church of England.

History
The archdeaconry was formed by Order in Council on 2 September 1842 from part of the Diocese of Durham archdeaconry of Northumberland; on 23 May 1882, the Diocese of Newcastle was created from those two archdeaconries. From 1842 to 2008, the Archdeaconry of Lindisfarne covered the deaneries of Morpeth, Alnwick, Bamburgh and Glendale, and Norham, and in 2008 this was extended to include Corbridge, Hexham and Bellingham.
In 2008, the role of Archdeacon of Lindisfarne became a full-time position for the first time in many years.

List of archdeacons
15 September 1842 – 3 April 1844 (d.): Edward Bigge
7 May 1844 – 1853 (res.): George Bland
2 April 1853 – 25 August 1865 (d.): Richard Coxe
1865–1882 (res.): George Hamilton
The archdeaconry has been in Newcastle diocese since the diocese's creation in 1882.
1882–1903: Henry Martin
1904–1914 (res.): Henry Hodgson
1914–14 February 1924 (d.): George Ormsby
1924–27 June 1944 (d.): Robert Mangin
1944–1955 (ret.): Thomas Forman
1956–24 December 1959 (d.): Wilfrid Pawson
1960–3 August 1969 (d.): Leonard Hawkes
1970–14 December 1980 (d.): Harry Bates
1981–1987 (res.): David Smith
1987–2000 (ret.): Michael Bowering
2001–2007 (ret.): Robert Langley (afterwards archdeacon emeritus)
9 March 200820 July 2020: Peter Robinson (became Dean of Derby)
14 November 2020present: Catherine Sourbut Groves

References

Sources

Lists of Anglicans
 
Religion in Northumberland
Lists of English people